Batovo is a rural locality (a village) in Rostilovskoye Rural Settlement, Gryazovetsky District, Vologda Oblast, Russia. The population was 117 as of 2002.

Geography 
Batovo is located 39 km south of Gryazovets (the district's administrative centre) by road. Maximovo is the nearest locality.
bat may be in sanskrit and dialekt of Arkhangelsk`s region

References 

Rural localities in Gryazovetsky District